Tokai Television Broadcasting Co., Ltd. (THK, 東海テレビ放送株式会社, often called Tokai TV (東海テレビ)) is a TV station affiliated with Fuji News Network (FNN) and Fuji Network System (FNS), serving in Aichi Prefecture, Gifu Prefecture, and Mie Prefecture, Japan. It is also known as Tokai Hoso Kaikan.

Offices
Headquarters - 14-27, Higashi-Sakura Itchome, Naka-ku, Nagoya, Aichi Prefecture, Japan
Tokyo Branch Office - Hibiya Chunichi Building, 1-4, Uchisaiwaicho Nichome, Chiyoda, Tokyo
Osaka Branch Office - Breeze Tower, 4-9, Umeda Nichome, Kita-ku, Osaka, Osaka Prefecture

Broadcasting

Analog
Analog TV was discontinued on July 24, 2011.

JOFX-TV
Nagoya TV Tower - Channel 1
Toyohashi - Channel 56
Nakatsugawa and Gujo-Hachiman - Channel 10
Gero - Channel 6
Owase and Takayama - Channel 8
Tajimi - Channel 55
Gifu-Nagara and Ise - Channel 57
Nabari - Channel 62, etc.

Digital
Digital TV began on December 1, 2003

JOFX-DTV
Remote controller ID 1
Nagoya (Seto Digital Tower), Nabari, Toba, Isobe, Kumano, and Iga - Channel 21
Toyohashi, Nagara, Chuno, Seki, Nakatsugawa, Ise and many others - Channel 15

Programs
News
News One (evening news)
FNN Tokai Telenews
Dramas aired from 1:30 p.m. until 2 p.m. on weekdays
Sports
Professional Baseball Live  (day game / night game) (プロ野球中継/プロ野球ナイター中継, baseball games of the Chunichi Dragons)
Keiba beat (競馬beat, horse racing live)
Nagoya Marathon
Tokai Classic (golf tournaments)

See also
Tokai Radio Broadcasting

Other TV stations in Nagoya
Chūkyō Television Broadcasting (CTV, affiliated with NTV and NNN / NNS) - 4
Chubu-Nippon Broadcasting Co.,Ltd (CBC, affiliated with TBS TV and JNN) - 5
Nagoya Broadcasting Network (NBN, affiliated with TV Asahi and ANN) - 6
Aichi Television Broadcasting (TVA, affiliated with TV Tokyo and TX Network) - 10

Link
http://www.tokai-tv.com/ - the official website of Tokai TV

Fuji News Network
Television stations in Nagoya
Television channels and stations established in 1958
Japanese companies established in 1958